The Paederinae are a subfamily of the Staphylinidae, rove beetles.  
The Paederinae include two tribes, Paederini and Pinophilini. This insect is commonly known as Tomcat.

Three of the genera of a subtribe of the Paederini are associated with a skin irritation called Paederus dermatitis, due to a potent vesicant in their haemolymph. This irritant, pederin, is highly toxic, more potent than cobra venom. Thirty-six genera and 436 species are found in North America, generally in damp places, under logs, in caves and ant nests, in litter, or on foliage. Genera include Rugilus and Trisunius.

References

External links

Paederinae at Bugguide.net. 

 
Beetle subfamilies